Catholic High School is a private, Catholic college-preparatory day school run by the United States Province of the Brothers of the Sacred Heart in Baton Rouge, Louisiana. It was founded in 1894 as St. Vincent's Academy. It offers grades eight through twelve.

History
Catholic High School was founded in 1894 as St. Vincent's Academy. The school was so named in recognition of the Society of St. Vincent de Paul, who helped organize and establish the school. The original site of the school was an old frame building in downtown Baton Rouge, and the enrollment was 106 students. By the 1920s, the enrollment had grown to approximately 300 students, and in 1928, the Brothers of the Sacred Heart built a new school, gym, and brother's residence at the corner of North Street and Fourth Street, and was renamed to Catholic High School.

In the 1930s and 1940s, the school's enrollment continued to increase, prompting the Brothers to acquire  of land in midtown Baton Rouge to build a campus to accommodate a larger student body, which was donated by R. Frank Cangelosi.  After 10 years of delayed construction, Catholic High School, with its student body of 450 students, moved to its present location at 855 Hearthstone Drive in September 1957. The original buildings on the new campus included a residence for brothers and teachers, a small building used as a PE locker room and band room, and the main building.  The main building at the time contained several offices, a library, six classrooms, and a few science lab classrooms.
In 1963, the gymnasium was built.  In 1971, the R. Frank Cangelosi Mall was built between the main building and gym for student use as an auxiliary cafeteria. In 1972, a new student wing, containing six classrooms, a cafeteria called the Union, and a library was added; the original library was converted into a faculty workroom.

In the early 1980s, a football practice field and baseball field were added, along with an all-weather track (which was renovated and repaved in 2000).  In 1985, the Fine Arts-Computer Center, containing a computer lab and classroom, a band room, a chorus room, art room, drafting room, and several classrooms was added. Around this time, the original band room was converted into a weight room.  In 1990, a maintenance shed was added, and in 1991, in preparation for the school's 100th anniversary, the Centennial Courtyard was built.  Also in the early 1990s, the school purchased three homes across the street from the campus to use as additional offices.

In the fall of 2002, the gymnasium was renovated to install air conditioning, and at that time CHS dedicated a new Health and Physical Education Center with a weight room, a wrestling room, locker rooms for athletes and PE students, and two new classrooms.  In 2005, the Brother Gordian Udinsky Science Center, containing updated science labs for biology, chemistry, and physics, a new computer lab, and several classrooms, was dedicated and opened.

On October 14, 2020, CHS celebrated the opening of the Brother Donnan Berry, S.C., Student Center. The 32,000 sf, two-story facility features a high-end commercial kitchen and dining for 600 downstairs as well as five classrooms, flexible study spaces, a conference room, and an expansive faculty wing on the second floor. Designed by local architects Tipton Associates, APAC, and Ritter Maher, the Student Center won an AIA Baton Rouge Rose Award for design excellence in August 2021.

In January 2021, Catholic High opened its new athletic Strength and Conditioning Center. The goal of the new structure is to provide CHS student-athletes with a second workout location on campus to meet the current demand from the different sports teams.

Academics

CHS offers 21 AP courses including US History, World History, Calculus, English Literature, Statistics, Psychology, French, and Biology.

Athletics 
Catholic High athletics competes in the LHSAA.

Catholic High school offers many sports to its students including football, swimming, wrestling, lacrosse, soccer, bowling, power lifting, ultimate frisbee, baseball, basketball, cross country, golf, tennis, and track and field.

Championships 
Football championships
(2) State Championships: 	2015, 2021

Notable alumni

 Fred S. LeBlanc, Class of 1916, former Louisiana attorney general, mayor of Baton Rouge, and judge
 Carl Weiss, Valedictorian of the Class of 1921, a local doctor and assassin of Huey Long
 Paul M. Hebert, Class of 1924, Dean of the LSU Law School (now known as the Paul M. Hebert Law Center)
 P.J. Mills, Class of 1951, former member of the Louisiana House of Representatives from Shreveport; former president of Blue Cross Blue Shield of Louisiana 
 Gayle Hatch, Class of 1957, head coach for the 2004 USA Men's Olympic Weightlifting Team
 John Fred, Class of 1959, musician and co-writer of the song "Judy in Disguise"
 Frank J. Polozola, Class of 1959, United States district court judge
 John Maginnis, Class of 1966, Louisiana political  journalist, author, and commentator[2]
 Warren Capone, Class of 1970, football player for the Dallas Cowboys and the Birmingham Americans
 Jeff Fortenberry, Class of 1978, Nebraska U.S. Representative
 Tim Joiner, Class of 1979, football player for the Houston Oilers and the Denver Broncos
 Neal Dellocono, Class of 1980, football player for the Dallas Cowboys and the Houston Oilers
 Erich Ponti, Class of 1983, member of the Louisiana House from Baton Rouge 
 Scott Woodward, Class of 1981, athletics director at LSU, Texas A&M and Washington[5]
 Garret Graves, Class of 1990, Louisiana U.S. Representative
 David Dellucci, Class of 1991, retired Major League Baseball player for the Baltimore Orioles, Arizona Diamondbacks (a member of the 2001 World Series  team), New York Yankees, Texas Rangers, Philadelphia Phillies, Cleveland Indians, and Toronto Blue Jays
 Warrick Dunn, Class of 1993, former running back for the Tampa Bay Buccaneers and Atlanta Falcons
 Kurt Ainsworth, Class of 1996, baseball player for the San Francisco Giants  and the Baltimore Orioles
 Major Applewhite, Class of 1997, football player at the University of Texas and head coach at the University of Houston
 Travis Minor, Class of 1997, football player for the Miami Dolphins and St. Louis Rams
 Donnie Jones, Class of 1999, football player for the LSU Tigers (1999–2003); Seattle Seahawks (2004); Miami Dolphins     (2005 & 2006); St. Louis Rams (2007–2011); Houston Texans (2012) and Philadelphia Eagles (2013-2017). Holder of numerous awards and team records, including being named NFC Special Teams Player of the Week in two     successive Eagle games in 2013.
 Chris Williams, Class of 2003, football player for the Chicago Bears, St. Louis Rams and Buffalo Bills
 Brandon Harrison, Class of 2003, football player for the Houston Texans
 Jeremy Stewart, Class of 2007, football player for the Oakland Raiders and the Denver Broncos
 Austin Nola, Class of 2008, MLB baseball player San Diego Padres[4]
 Aaron Nola, Class of 2011, MLB All Star baseball player, Philadelphia Phillies[3]
 Cameron Tom, Class of 2013, NFL player for the Miami Dolphins
 Derrius Guice, Class of 2015, NFL running back[1]
 Clyde Edwards-Helaire, Class of 2017, football player for the Kansas City Chiefs

References

External links
 Official Site
Faculty and Staff

Schools in Baton Rouge, Louisiana
Private elementary schools in Louisiana
Private middle schools in Louisiana
Catholic secondary schools in Louisiana
Boys' schools in Louisiana
Schools accredited by the Southern Association of Colleges and Schools
1894 establishments in Louisiana
Educational institutions established in 1894